Shemara Wikramanayake (born 1962) is an Australian businesswoman. She embarked on a career as a lawyer and then as a banker. In 2018, she became the Managing Director and CEO of Macquarie Group Ltd. She is also well known for her efforts in implementing creative strategies and methodologies to finance low carbon emissions and has also made collaborations with powerful forces to achieve the goal of low carbon emissions. She has often advocated to increase renewable energy production and has also called on the governments to quadruple renewable energy production by 2030 with the intention to minimize the global effects of climate change.

Wikramanayake received a total of $A23.7 million in compensation in 2022, making her the highest paid CEO in Australia for the second year in a row.

Career 
Wikramanayake worked as a corporate lawyer at Blake Dawson Waldron before joining Macquarie Group Ltd in 1987. She headed Macquarie’s corporate advisory office in New Zealand and she was also instrumental in setting up corporate advisory offices in Hong Kong and Malaysia. She worked with Macquarie Capital for nearly 20 years and was appointed as the head of the Macquarie Asset Management in 2008 and headed the asset management arm of the company for more than a decade.

In December 2018, she replaced Nicholas Moore as Managing Director/CEO of Macquarie Group. Prior to this, Wikramanayake was the group head of Macquarie Asset Management. She also went onto become the first female CEO of Macquarie Group and also turned out to be the sixth CEO of Macquarie Group.

In 2018, she was appointed as the Commissioner of the Global Commission on Adaptation, a commission which was initiated by the World Bank to implement and accelerate climate adaptation action plan. In 2019, she was appointed to the UN’s Climate Finance Leadership Initiative by Michael Bloomberg.

She is the only female CEO among Australia's 20 biggest companies by market value and the first Asian-Australian woman to head an ASX 200 listed company. In 2019, she also entered the record books as the first woman ever to become Australia’s top earning CEO.

She was ranked 29th in the list of Most Powerful Women in the World for the Year 2020 by Forbes. She was ranked 24th in the list of Most Powerful Women in the World for the Year 2021 by Forbes. She was also named as one of Fortune’s Most Powerful and Influential Women in a roundup of global female business leaders segment.

She was also one of the speakers who attended the 2021 United Nations Climate Change Conference which was held in Glasgow and she spoke about the mobilizing private climate finance for emerging markets. Her presence at the Glasgow G20 International Conference on Climate burnished her reputation and emphasized her green credentials while she was also seated next to Australian Prime Minister Scott Morrison. She was initially implied as the de facto leader of Australian delegation during the COP26 summit as rumours started circulating that Morrison would not be probably attending the COP26 conference.

She was also named as of The Australian Financial Review Business People of the Year for 2021 in recognition of her leadership prowess amid the COVID-19 pandemic related uncertainties.

She received $16.39 million in compensation in 2021. This coincided with Macquarie recording a $1.3 billion profit in the last quarter of 2021.

She is also regarded as the longest serving senior employee of Macquarie with roughly over 35 years of experience. She also formulated strategies to position Macquarie Group to take the centre-stage at the COP26 initiative to find $137 million in financing from governments, private sector institutions and multi-later development banks to pay for the decarbonisation of emerging countries over the next ten years.

She also provides advice and consultancy on green technology investment to the Government of Australia.

She was also appointed as the co-chair of the Climate Finance Leadership Initiative in India.

Personal life
She was born in England, where her Sri Lankan father was a doctor. Her father Ranji had graduated from the medical school in 1958 and alongside his wife Amara, he initially moved to England for further training in the field of medicine in 1958. The couple initially settled down in England and brought up their two daughters Roshana and Shemara. The Wikramanayake family faced major constraints and difficulties during their brief stay in England as they were forced to flee the country soon after the allegations were raised against her grandfather over the breach of money control laws. Her family also reported to have faced racism in England which also likely prompted their decision to leave England with a prospect of moving to Australia in order to rebuild and revive their careers and fortunes.

She attended a state school in London before the family moved to Australia, where she went to Ascham School. She moved to Australia at the age of 14 along with her family in the 1970s and the family carried only just around $200 with them when they reached Australia. In 2018, in an interview with Australian Financial Review her father Ranji Wikramanayake recalled the fond memories of their life in Sri Lanka and revealed that they enjoyed luxurious and privileged life while growing up in Sri Lanka but they thought of migrating to Australia after going through some tough times. The Wikramanayake family settled in Australian city Sydney in 1975 and Ranji was offered a part-time job at the Royal Prince Alfred Hospital. Her elder sister Roshana became a senior policy lawyer at the New South Wales Bar Association and her younger brother serves as a surgeon at the Southern Highlands Private Hospital.

She pursued Bachelor of Commerce and Bachelor of Law from the University of New South Wales in 1985. and would later complete the Advanced Management Program at Harvard Business School in 1996.

References 

1962 births
Australian women chief executives
21st-century Australian businesswomen
21st-century Australian businesspeople
Living people
Australian people of Sri Lankan descent
University of New South Wales Law School alumni
Australian women lawyers
English emigrants to Australia
People educated at Ascham School
20th-century Australian businesswomen
20th-century Australian businesspeople